JunYi Chow is a music composer born in Kuala Lumpur, Malaysia.

Chow's music has been performed in many places, including Malaysia, Singapore, China, Taiwan, Hong Kong, Indonesia, Japan, Korea, Germany, Italy, Lithuania, United States, and Canada. As a pianist and cellist, Chow plays Classical repertoire as well as free improvisations with musicians in KL, Beijing, and New York City.

Honors 
 2017, Kampung and the City won Best Orchestral Work, Best Orchestration and HKCO Musicians’ Favourite awards by Hong Kong Chinese Orchestra's international composition competition
 2014, Brian Israel Prize Winners and Honorable Mentions by Society for New Music
 2013, Finalist for ASCAP Foundation Morton Gould Young Composers Prize
 2012, Beijing Modern Music Festival, Chow's Pipa and symphony orchestra Dialogue was selected in Young Composers’ Project. 
 2010, Chow's symphony work Getaran, was commissioned and premiered by Malaysian Philharmonic Youth Orchestra and toured in Malaysia to perform
 2010, Kampung won the 2nd Place in Taipei Chinese Orchestra (TCO) International Composition Competition (1st place vacant)

See also 
Malaysian contemporary music#The New Generation

References

External links
The Teng Company: Chow Jun Yi

Year of birth missing (living people)
Living people
Malaysian male composers